Moninho Viegas, o Gasco or Monio Viegas (950-1022) was a medieval Knight, he fought the Moors of Almanzor in Portugal.

Biography 
Moninho was born in Gascony, he arrived in Portugal to join the forces of Ramiro III of León against the Moors. 

Moninho Viegas was the founder of Monastery of Villa-Boas.

References 

950 births
1022 deaths
10th-century people from the Kingdom of León
11th-century people from the Kingdom of León
Portuguese nobility
Spanish Roman Catholics